Zouheir El Graoui (born 8 July 1994) is a Moroccan indoor and beach volleyball player. He is part of the Moroccan national team, a participant in the beach volleyball tournament at the Olympic Games Tokyo 2020. At the professional club level, he plays for PSG Stal Nysa.

Career

Beach volleyball
El Graoui won the gold medal at the 2017 African Beach Volleyball Championships in Maputo and the 2019 African Beach Volleyball Championships in Abuja, the bronze medal at the 2019 All-Africa Beach Games in Sal and the silver medal at the 2019 All-Africa Games in Rabat.

Indoor volleyball
El Graoui played for Tihad Sportif Club from 2010 to 2013, at Al Khor SC in Qatar from 2015 to 2016, and at Asswehly Sports Club in Libya from 2016 to 2017. 

He played in France for Stade Poitevin Poitiers, before signing a two–year contract with Tours VB in 2020.

Olympic Games
El Graoui represented Morocco at the 2020 Summer Olympics alongside Mohamed Abicha. The duo was defeated in all three games.

Individual awards
 2021: CAVB African Championship – Best Receiver

References

External links
 
 
 
 Zouheir El Graoui at PlusLiga.pl  
 Zouheir El Graoui at Volleybox.net 
 
 
 

Living people
1994 births
Sportspeople from Casablanca
Moroccan men's volleyball players
Moroccan beach volleyball players
Olympic beach volleyball players of Morocco
Beach volleyball players at the 2020 Summer Olympics
Moroccan expatriate sportspeople in Qatar
Expatriate volleyball players in Qatar
Moroccan expatriate sportspeople in Libya
Moroccan expatriate sportspeople in France
Expatriate volleyball players in France
Moroccan expatriate sportspeople in Poland
Expatriate volleyball players in Poland
Stal Nysa players
Outside hitters